Ruzyně is a district of Prague city, part of Prague 6. It has been a part of Prague since 1960.

Václav Havel Airport is located in this district. Czech Airlines has its head office on the grounds of the airport. Travel Service Airlines and its low cost subsidiary Smart Wings have their head office on the airport property. In addition the Civil Aviation Authority also has its head office on the airport property.

Ruzyně Remand Prison is also located within the neighbourhood.

Neighbouring districts

References

Prague 6